Jalmari Väisänen (30 January 1893, Kotka – 10 July 1983) was a Finnish farmer and politician. He was a Member of the Parliament of Finland from 1929 to 1945 and again from 1951 to 1954, representing the Social Democratic Party of Finland (SDP).

References

1893 births
1983 deaths
People from Kotka
People from Viipuri Province (Grand Duchy of Finland)
Social Democratic Party of Finland politicians
Members of the Parliament of Finland (1929–30)
Members of the Parliament of Finland (1930–33)
Members of the Parliament of Finland (1933–36)
Members of the Parliament of Finland (1936–39)
Members of the Parliament of Finland (1939–45)
Members of the Parliament of Finland (1951–54)
Finnish people of World War II
Place of death missing